Catholic University Los Angeles of Chimbote (Universidad Católica Los Ángeles de Chimbote; Uladech Católica or Uladech) is a Catholic university in Chimbote, Peru. The university's rector as of 2013 is Ing. Dr. Julio B. Domínguez Granda.

The university opened in 1985. Law No. 24163 established the university.

References

External links

 Universidad Católica Los Ángeles de Chimbote 
 Professional School of Administration
 Professional School of Tourism Management

Catholic universities and colleges in Peru
Buildings and structures in Ancash Region
Educational institutions established in 1985
1985 establishments in Peru